"Splash" is the fourth single from drum and bass artist Sub Focus to be released from his self-titled debut album Sub Focus. The single features vocals from British singer Coco and managed to reach number 41 in the UK Singles Chart upon release. The song is featured in the soundtrack to the video game F1 2010.

Track listing
Digital download (EP)

Vinyl No. 1 (drum and bass)

Vinyl No. 2 (dubstep)

Music video
A music video accompanying the single was released on 24 April 2010. The video features an actor posing as Sub Focus and Coco performing the song in an unknown location in East London, where Coco takes out her anger on a drum kit. At various stages throughout the music video, Coco is seen singing in front of the Grand Union Flag. To accompany the music, the lights flicker on and off throughout the music video, while Coco appears distorted for effect.

Chart performance
"Splash" debuted on the UK Singles Chart at number 41 on 23 May 2010 as well as number seven on the UK Dance Chart. The following week, the single fell to number 73 and number eight, respectively. On 6 June 2010, "Splash" fell to number 91 before falling out of the top 100 the following week.

Release history

References

2010 singles
Sub Focus songs
RAM Records singles
Songs written by Karen Poole
2009 songs
Songs written by Sub Focus